NGC 6445, also known as the Little Gem Nebula or Box Nebula, is a planetary nebula in the constellation Sagittarius. It was discovered by William Herschel on May 28, 1786. The distance of NGC 6445 is estimated to be slightly more than 1,000 parsecs based on the parallax measured by Gaia, which was measured at  mas.

Characteristics 
NGC 6445 has been classified as a bipolar planetary nebula. Its He/H and N/O abundance ratios are consistent with the Type I definition. In optical images, NGC 6445 features a bright, central ring-shaped morphology and open bipolar lobes; the outer envelope emission of NGC 6445 is [N ii]-dominant.

Wide-field optical images obtained by the Nordic Optical Telescope (NOT) Andalucía Faint Object Spectrograph and Camera (ALFOSC) show that NGC 6445 has an irregularly shaped central region with a size of ~40" × 50", where the [O iii] emission dominates, while the [N ii] emission is much more extended and defines an overall bipolar morphology. The bipolar lobes are along the east–west (EW) direction with position angle ~ 80°, stretching to about 1'.6 from the center. There are also many filamentary structures across the nebula, which hint at a more complex morphology of NGC 6445. The breadths of the EW lobes reach ~1'.8 at both ends. This means given the distance of NGC 6445 that the nebula is 4 light years across and is among the largest known. NGC 6445 has a faint halo, seen in residual H2 emission images, which show filamentary features well outside the central region along the north–south (NS) direction. These filaments are located ~1'.3 – 1'.6 from the center. The southern filaments are more extended along the EW direction. There are also rays of faint emission coming from the central region.

A close comparison of the residual H2 image against the Spitzer IRAC 8.0 μm and the NOT ALFOSC [N ii] images shows that along NS direction the H2 emission generally delineates the outer boundary of a broad region where the 8.0 μm emission dominates, while the [N ii] emission is more extended along the EW direction, consistent with the bipolar morphology, and is confined within the 8.0 μm-emitting region along the north–south direction. Along this direction, the H2 emission appears to be slightly farther out than the [N ii] emission. This reinforces the notion that the optical emission may be significantly affected by the illumination of UV photons and cannot represent the intrinsic matter distribution of PNe. The [N ii] image mainly traces the bipolar lobes, while the H2 image reveals the limb-brightened gas extended along the equatorial direction.

The northern and the southern H2-emitting filaments, ~1'.4 – 1'.6 from the center of NGC 6445, might be the outer boundaries of an edge-on-viewed torus of this PN. This torus was ejected in the AGB phase, when the projenitor star was a red giant, and is now being disrupted by interaction with the fast stellar wind that was developed later. The south region of the torus seems to be much more disrupted than its north counterpart. Within the EW bipolar lobes, there seem to be two arcs in the H2 emission, as shown in the residual image: a northeast (NE) arc and a southwest (SW) one, both ~1'.0 from the nebular center. The SW arc seems to be disrupted but matches the position of a giant arc in [N ii]. These two H2 arcs might define another pair of bipolar lobes, which have a PA ~ 56°. This PA generally agrees with that of the [O iii]-right inner nebular region of NGC 6445, suggesting that the smaller bipolar bubbles are of relatively higher excitation and thus might have developed recently.

Observation 
NGC 6445 lies 2.1 degrees southwest from the open cluster Messier 23. NGC 6445 can be located by star hopping from Messier 23, by firstly locating an arc of 7th and 8th magnitude stars one degree southwest of M23, with the nebula lying 5 arcminutes west of an 8th magnitude star that lies 40 arcminutes west of the southernmost star of the arc. The globular cluster NGC 6440 lies 23 arcminutes to the south and both ojects can be seen in a wide field eyepiece. In low magnification the nebula appears like a fuzzy star and higher magnifications reveal its rectangular disk. The planetary nebula is included in the Herschel 400 Catalogue.

References

External links 

Planetary nebulae
Sagittarius (constellation)
6445
Discoveries by William Herschel